The 2013–14 Håndboldligaen is the 78th season of the Håndboldligaen, Denmark's premier Handball league.

Team information 

The following 14 clubs compete in the Håndboldligaen during the 2013–14 season:

Personnel and kits
Following is the list of clubs competing in 2013–14 Nemzeti Bajnokság I, with their manager, captain, kit manufacturer and shirt sponsor.

Regular season

Standings

Pld - Played; W - Won; L - Lost; PF - Points for; PA - Points against; Diff - Difference; Pts - Points.

Championship Round

Group 1

Pld - Played; W - Won; L - Lost; PF - Points for; PA - Points against; Diff - Difference; Pts - Points.

Results (Group 1)
In the table below the home teams are listed on the left and the away teams along the top.

Group 2

Pld - Played; W - Won; L - Lost; PF - Points for; PA - Points against; Diff - Difference; Pts - Points.

Results (Group 2)
In the table below the home teams are listed on the left and the away teams along the top.

Championship Playoffs 
Teams in bold won the playoff series. Numbers to the left of each team indicate the team's original playoff seeding. Numbers to the right indicate the score of each playoff game.

Relegation Round

Group 1

Pld - Played; W - Won; L - Lost; PF - Points for; PA - Points against; Diff - Difference; Pts - Points.

Results (Group 1)
In the table below the home teams are listed on the left and the away teams along the top.

Group 2

Pld - Played; W - Won; L - Lost; PF - Points for; PA - Points against; Diff - Difference; Pts - Points.

Results (Group 2)
In the table below the home teams are listed on the left and the away teams along the top.

References

External links
 Danish Handball Federaration 

2013–14 domestic handball leagues
Handball competitions in Denmark
2013 in Danish sport
2014 in Danish sport